Rabindra Nath Sharma (died 22 November 2008) was a Nepalese politician, leader of the Rastriya Prajatantra Party and Minister of Finance of Nepal from 1997 to 1998.

References 

2008 deaths
Year of birth missing
Finance ministers of Nepal
Rastriya Prajatantra Party politicians